Šaronje may refer to:

 Šaronje (Novi Pazar), a village in Serbia
 Šaronje (Tutin), a village in Serbia